The Somerset County Vocational and Technical High School (SCVTHS) is a fully accredited, four-year vocational public high school located on an  campus in Bridgewater Township, in Somerset County, New Jersey, United States. The school is part of the Somerset County Vocational and Technical School District, which serves students in ninth through twelfth grades from all of Somerset County. The school offers over 20 different programs, on both a full-time and part-time basis, that combine training in occupational and academic skills.

As of the 2021–22 school year, the school had an enrollment of 347 students and 58.4 classroom teachers (on an FTE basis), for a student–teacher ratio of 5.9:1. There were 33 students (9.5% of enrollment) eligible for free lunch and 4 (1.2% of students) eligible for reduced-cost lunch.

Full-time students earn both a high school diploma and a vocational certificate in their specific specialty area. Part-time students earn a certificate from SCVTHS in their specialty area, and receive an academic education at their home district. Starting with the 2009-10 school year, full-time students have a college track option for their academic classes.

Awards, recognition and rankings
Schooldigger.com ranked the school as 74th out of 416 public high schools statewide in its 2019 rankings (an increase of 29 positions from the 2018 ranking) based on test scores from the NJSLA English Language Arts, Algebra I, Geometry, and Algebra II exams.

Academic programs

Gifted and Talented Performing Arts Program
Somerset Vo-Tech offers a rigorous performing arts program that divides into two branches: Acting and Acting with Vocal Music. All Theater Arts Majors at SCVTHS are taught by the guidelines of Sanford Meisner. The program is very competitive as it is known to only hold about 50 students (grades 9-12) total. The Theater Department produces one main-stage production each year in the fall.

Academy for Health and Medical Sciences
The Academy for Health and Medical Sciences is a program offered as a "school within a school" as a partnership between the high school and Raritan Valley Community College. In this program, students earn up to 64 college credits from the college, graduating with a high school diploma from SCVTHS as well as an associate's degree from the college.

Athletics
The Somerset County Vo-Tech Jaguars compete independently with interscholastic sports operating under the supervision of the New Jersey State Interscholastic Athletic Association (NJSIAA). With 372 students in grades 10-12, the school was classified by the NJSIAA for the 2019–20 school year as Group I for most athletic competition purposes, which included schools with an enrollment of 75 to 476 students in that grade range.

Notable alumni
 Alex Abrahantes (born 1977), professional wrestler, manager and on-air television personality.

References

External links 
Somerset County Vocational and Technical High School website

School Data for the Somerset County Vocational and Technical High School, National Center for Education Statistics

Bridgewater Township, New Jersey
Public high schools in Somerset County, New Jersey
Vocational schools in New Jersey